Upper Bear Creek is an unincorporated community and a census-designated place (CDP) located in and governed by Clear Creek County, Colorado, United States. The CDP is a part of the Denver–Aurora–Lakewood, CO Metropolitan Statistical Area. The population of the Upper Bear Creek CDP was 1,059 at the United States Census 2010. The Evergreen post office (Zip Code 80439) serves the area.

History
The Upper Bear Creek area is rich in history - Troutdale in the Pines, a posh resort hotel, catered to Hollywood movie stars and America's elite in the 1920s and served as a vacation spot for Denverites escaping the summer heat. Other summer resorts sprang up in the area as well, including the Greystone Guest Ranch and the Brookforest Inn. In more recent history, Willie Nelson, Lee Majors, Farrah Fawcett, and others have lived along Upper Bear Creek.

Additionally, the Mt. Evans Outdoor Lab School, a campus of the Jefferson County Public Schools, is located in the Upper Bear Creek area. Many Jeffco 6th graders will spend a week at Mt. Evans, or the other outdoor lab school, Windy Peak, where they stay in cabins or dorms and study various aspects of the outdoors, including forestry, astronomy, ecology, and pioneer history, among others.

Generally regarded as the most exclusive and desirable area within Evergreen, Upper Bear Creek features outstanding trout fishing (for homeowners and guests), peaceful serenity and meadows, and in many spots views of Mt. Evans. The population as of the 2010 Census was 1,059.

Geography

Demographics

See also

Outline of Colorado
Index of Colorado-related articles
State of Colorado
Colorado cities and towns
Colorado census-designated places
Colorado counties
Clear Creek County, Colorado
Colorado metropolitan areas
Front Range Urban Corridor
North Central Colorado Urban Area
Denver-Aurora-Boulder, CO Combined Statistical Area
Denver-Aurora-Broomfield, CO Metropolitan Statistical Area

References

External links

Clear Creek County website

Census-designated places in Clear Creek County, Colorado
Census-designated places in Colorado
Denver metropolitan area